Deparia (or the false spleenworts) is a genus of ferns. The Pteridophyte Phylogeny Group classification of 2016 (PPG I) places the genus in the family Athyriaceae, although other sources include it within an expanded Aspleniaceae or Woodsiaceae.

Species
, the Checklist of Ferns and Lycophytes of the World accepted the following species (with a note that there are "probably still too many described species in China").

Deparia abbreviata (W.M.Chu) Z.R.He
Deparia acrostichoides (Sw.) M.Kato
Deparia allantodioides (Bedd.) M.Kato
Deparia auriculata (W.M.Chu & Z.R.Wang) Z.R.Wang
Deparia biserialis (Baker) M.Kato
Deparia bonincola (Nakai) M.Kato
Deparia boryana (Willd.) M.Kato
Deparia brevipinna (Ching & K.H.Shing ex Z.R.Wang) Z.R.Wang
Deparia cataracticola M.Kato
Deparia chinensis (Ching) X.S.Guo & C.Du
Deparia confluens (Kunze) M.Kato
Deparia confusa (Ching & Y.P.Hsu) Z.R.Wang
Deparia conilii (Franch. & Sav.) M.Kato
Deparia coreana (Christ) M.Kato – Korean tapering glade fern
Deparia dawuense C.M.Kuo
Deparia dickasonii M.Kato
Deparia dimorphophylla (Koidz.) M.Kato
Deparia dolosa (Christ) M.Kato
Deparia erecta (Z.R.Wang) M.Kato
Deparia falcatipinnula (Z.R.Wang) Z.R.Wang
Deparia fenzliana (Luerss.) M.Kato
Deparia formosana (Rosenst.) R.Sano
Deparia forsythii-majoris (C.Chr.) M.Kato
Deparia giraldii (Christ) X.C.Zhang
Deparia gordonii (Baker) M.Kato
Deparia hainanensis (Ching) R.Sano
Deparia henryi (Baker) M.Kato
Deparia heterophlebia (Mett. ex Baker) R.Sano
Deparia hirtirachis (Ching ex Z.R.Wang) Z.R.Wang
Deparia japonica (Thunb.) M.Kato
Deparia jinfoshanensis (Z.Y.Liu) Z.R.He
Deparia jiulungensis (Ching) Z.R.Wang
Deparia kaalaana (Copel.) M.Kato
Deparia kiusiana (Koidz.) M.Kato
Deparia lancea (Thunb.) Fraser-Jenk.
Deparia liangshanensis (Ching ex Z.R.Wang) Z.R.Wang
Deparia lobatocrenata (Tagawa) M.Kato
Deparia longipes (Ching) Shinohara
Deparia longipilosa Rakotondr.
Deparia ludingensis (Z.R.Wang & Li Bing Zhang) Z.R.Wang
Deparia lushanensis (J.X.Li) Z.R.He
Deparia macdonellii (Bedd.) M.Kato
Deparia marginalis (Hillebr.) M.Kato
Deparia marojejyensis (Tardieu) M.Kato
Deparia membranacea (Ching & Z.Y.Liu) Fraser-Jenk.
Deparia minamitanii Seriz.
Deparia okuboana (Makino) M.Kato
Deparia omeiensis (Z.R.Wang) M.Kato
Deparia otomasui (Sa. Kurata) Seriz.
Deparia pachyphylla (Ching) Z.R.He
Deparia parvisora (C.Chr.) M.Kato
Deparia petersenii (Kunze) M.Kato
Deparia polyrhiza (Baker) Seriz.
Deparia prolifera (Kaulf.) Hook. & Grev.
Deparia pseudoconilii (Seriz.) Seriz.
Deparia pterorachis (Christ) M.Kato
Deparia pycnosora (Christ) M.Kato
Deparia septentrionalis Rakotondr.
Deparia setigera (Ching ex Y.T.Hsieh) Z.R.Wang
Deparia shandongensis (J.X.Li & Z.C.Ding) Z.R.He
Deparia shennongensis (Ching, Boufford & K.H.Shing) X.C.Zhang
Deparia sichuanensis (Z.R.Wang) Z.R.Wang
Deparia stenoptera (Christ) Z.R.Wang
Deparia subfluvialis (Hayata) M.Kato
Deparia subsimilis (Christ) Fraser-Jenk.
Deparia tenuifolia (Kirk) M.Kato
Deparia thwaitesii (A.Br. ex Mett.) Christenh.
Deparia timetensis (E.D.Br.) M.Kato
Deparia tomitaroana (Masam.) R.Sano
Deparia truncata (Ching ex Z.R.Wang) Z.R.Wang
Deparia unifurcata (Baker) M.Kato
Deparia vegetior (Kitag.) X.C.Zhang
Deparia vermiformis (Ching, Boufford & K.H.Shing) Z.R.Wang
Deparia viridifrons (Makino) M.Kato
Deparia wangzhongrenii L.Y.Kuo, M.Kato & W.L.Chiou
Deparia wilsonii (Christ) X.C.Zhang
Deparia yunnanensis (Ching) R.Sano
Deparia zeylanica (Hook.) M.Kato

Some hybrids are also known:
Deparia × angustata (Nakai) Nakaike
Deparia × kanghsienensis (Ching & Y.P.Hsu) Z.R.He
Deparia × kiyozumiana (Sa. Kurata) Shimura
Deparia × nakaikeana Fraser-Jenk.
Deparia × nanchuanensis  (Ching & Z.Y.Liu) Z.R.He

References

Athyriaceae
Fern genera